Mikhail Alexandrovich Burchalin (born 25 June 1993) is a Russian sport shooter. He represented Russia at the 2015 Summer Universiade, most notably winning a bronze at the Men's 50 metre rifle three positions.

Biography and career
Mikhail studied at the Tambov State University named after G. R. Derzhavin. He has been working for the shooting club DOSAAF since 2004. Michael trains under the guidance of Master of Sports USSR Molchanov A.A.

Michael repeatedly became the winner and prize-winner of the Championship of Russia and competitions of Russian national level, then in 2011 became part of the Russian team.

In 2013 he won his first International Medal — Gold medal at the World DOSAAF Championship in Dushanbe (team standings). The same year, he was a candidate to participate in the World Summer Universiade 2013 in Kazan. But because of a problem with the weapon Michael unsuccessfully made in crucial qualifying start, thus placed the fifth on the qualifying list (only three people can be in command).

Two years later he passed selection at the World Universiade 2015 (Gwangju, South Korea) and won a bronze medal in shooting small-bore rifle from a distance of 50 meters from three positions (team competition).

References

1993 births
Living people
Russian male sport shooters
Universiade medalists in shooting
Universiade bronze medalists for Russia
Medalists at the 2015 Summer Universiade
Sportspeople from Tambov